Golden Grove was built at Whitby in 1780 as Russian Merchant, and was renamed Golden Grove in 1782. She served as a storeship for the First Fleet to Australia. Thereafter she sailed to the Mediterranean and the Baltic. She is last listed in 1811–1813.

Early career
Russian Merchant first appeared in Lloyd's Register in 1781 with T. Parker, master, Leighton, owner, and trade Saint Petersburg—London.

{| class="sortable wikitable"
|-
! Year
! Name
! Master
! Owner
! Trade
|-
| 1782
| Russian MerchantGolden Grove<ref>[https://hdl.handle.net/2027/mdp.39015004281203?urlappend=%3Bseq=266 Lloyd's  Register (1782), Seq.№R177.]</ref> 
| T.Parker
| Leighton
| Saint Petersburg—London
|-
| 1783
| Golden Grove| J. Mann
| Leighton
| London-Jamaica
|-
| 1784
| Golden Grove| J. Mann
| Leighton
| Jamaica-London
|-
| 1786
| Golden Grove| Thompson
| Leighton
| London
|-
| 1787
| Golden Grove| W. Sharp
| Leighton
| London—Botany Bay
|-
|}
  
First FleetGolden Groves master was William Sharp. The Fleet's chaplain Richard Johnson and his wife and servant travelled to New South Wales on this ship.

She left Portsmouth on 13 May 1787, and arrived at Botany Bay, Sydney, Australia, on 26 January 1788 but left for Port Jackson soon after. On 2 October 1788 she took 21 male and 11 female convicts to Norfolk Island, returning to Port Jackson on 25 October.  She left Port Jackson on 19 November 1788, keeping company with  until losing sight of her on 11 April 1789 after several days at the Falkland Islands for the recovery of crew members who were sick with scurvy. She arrived back in England on 9 June 1789.

Later career and fateLloyd's Register for 1791 shows Golden Grove, with Sharp, master, and trade London—Botany Bay, changing to London—Stettin. Lloyd's Register for 1805 listed Golden Grove, of 333 tons (bm), built in 1780 at Whitby, F. Blair, master, J. Sutton, owner, with trade London—Elsinor. This entry continues unchanged until 1811. The Register of Shipping carries an identical entry until 1811.

Postscript
A former inner-city suburb of Sydney was named after the ship. This suburb has now been largely subsumed into a small locality, part of Newtown and Camperdown and the name today is carried only by some maps and a street in the area.

An Urban Transit Authority First Fleet ferry was named after Golden Grove'' in 1986.

See also

First Fleet
Journals of the First Fleet

Citations and references
Citations

References

External links
  [CC-By-SA]

1780 ships
Ships built in Whitby
Ships of the First Fleet
Convict ships to Norfolk Island
Age of Sail merchant ships
Merchant ships of the United Kingdom